Makho is a village in Georgia, situated on the Makho river. It is part of Khelvachauri Municipality. The village is known for it medieval arched bridge.

According to census held in 2014, the population of village was 2 479.

See also
 Adjara

References 

Populated places in Adjara
Georgia (country)–Turkey border crossings